Before the Acts of Union 1707, the barons of the shire of Peebles elected commissioners to represent them in the unicameral Parliament of Scotland and in the Convention of the Estates.

From 1708 Peeblesshire was represented by one Member of Parliament in the House of Commons of Great Britain.

List of shire commissioners

 1608 and 1609: Sir John Murray of Blackbarony
 1617 and 1625: Sir Archibald Murray of Blackbarony
 1621–25: Sir John Stewart of Traquair
 1628–33: John Hay of Smithfield, Esquire of the Body
 1628–33: 1630 convention: James Naismith of Posso
 1630 convention, 1643, 1644–45, 1648: Laird of Dawick (Veitch)  
 1639–41: Sir Alexander Murray of Blackbarony
 1639–41, 1644–45: David Murray of Stanehopes 
 1643: Sir James Hay of Smithfield
 1645, 1648: Laird of Prestongrange (Morison)
 1649-50: John Dickson of Hartrie, Senator of College of Justice
 1649–51: Sir James Murray of Skirling
 1661–63, 1665 convention, 1667 convention: Sir William Murray of Stanhope and Broughton
 1661–63, 1665 convention, 1667 convention, 1669–74, 1678 convention, 1681–82, 1685–86, 1689 convention, 1689–98: Sir Archibald Murray of Blackbarony (died c.1700)
 1678 convention: John Veitch the younger of Dawick
 1681–82, 1689 convention, 1689–93: Sir David Murray of Stanhope and Broughton (expelled 1693)
 1685–86: James Douglas of Skirling
 1693–98: Alexander Murray of Halmyre
 1700–02: Sir Alexander Murray of Blackbarony
 1702-07: William Morison of Prestoungrange
 1702-07: Alexander Horseburgh of that Ilk

References

See also
 List of constituencies in the Parliament of Scotland at the time of the Union

Constituencies of the Parliament of Scotland (to 1707)
Constituencies disestablished in 1707
1707 disestablishments in Scotland
Politics of the Scottish Borders
History of the Scottish Borders